E with dot above (Э̇ э̇; italics: Э̇ э̇) is a letter of the Cyrillic script.

E with dot above is used in the Tundra Nenets language.

See also
É é : Latin letter E with acute
Ȩ ȩ : Latin letter E with cedilla
Ê ê : Latin letter E with circumflex
Ė ė : Latin letter E with dot above
Ẹ ẹ : Latin letter E with dot below
Э э : Cyrillic letter E
Cyrillic characters in Unicode

Cyrillic letters with diacritics
Letters with dot